Roncade is a comune (municipality) in the Province of Treviso in the Italian region Veneto, located about  north of Venice and about  southeast of Treviso.  
 
Roncade borders the following municipalities: Casale sul Sile, Meolo, Monastier di Treviso, Quarto d'Altino, San Biagio di Callalta, Silea.

References

External links
 Official website